Mary Grace Simpson  (12 November 1920 – 8 February 2007) was a British archaeologist and museum curator specialising in the study of Roman ceramics, especially Samian ware.

Biography

Early life
Simpson spent her early years in Newcastle, where her father F. G. Simpson was Director of Archaeological Field Research and went to school at Penrhos College. She served as a nurse during the Second World War.

Career
After the war, Simpson studied at UCL Institute of Archaeology, graduating with a Diploma in European Archaeology in 1948. Her fellow students included Nancy Sandars and Edward Pyddoke. Between 1950 and 1954 she was a research assistant to Eric Birley at Durham University. Between 1950 and 1972 Simpson was the Honorary Curator of the Clayton Collection of antiquities at Chesters Roman fort. She undertook postgraduate study at Lady Margaret Hall, Oxford and was awarded her DPhil from Oxford in 1960. The subject of this thesis was published in 1964 as Britons and the Roman Army: A Study of Wales and the Southern Pennines in the 1st-3rd Centuries. She taught at Oxford for the Department of Extra-Mural Studies and was a visiting fellow at Haverford College, Pennsylvania.

Simpson's study of the late Joseph Stanfield's investigations into samian ware resulted in the 1958 publication of Central Gaulish Potters, which remains an essential work for the study of the subject more than fifty years on. She was one of the early member of the Rei cretariae Romanae fautores, a specialist study group for Roman ceramicists, following its founding 1957 and organised the 14th Congress of the society in Oxford and London in September 1984.

Select publications
Simpson, G. 1948. Guide to Chesters Museum with notes on the Roman fort, bridge and bath-house etc. Durham.
Simpson. G. 1964. Britons and the Roman Army: A Study of Wales and the Southern Provinces in the 1st-3rd Centuries. London.
Simpson, F. G. (Edited by Simpon, G.). 1976. Watermills and Military Works on Hadrian's Wall. Excavations in Northumberland. Kendal.
Simpson, G. 2000. Roman Weapons, Tools, Bronze Equipment and Brooches from Neuss: Nouaesium Excavations 1955-1972 (BAR International Series 862).

References 

Classical archaeologists
British women archaeologists
British archaeologists
Women classical scholars
Alumni of Lady Margaret Hall, Oxford
Fellows of the Society of Antiquaries of London
2007 deaths
1920 births
Haverford College faculty
British women historians
20th-century archaeologists
Scholars of ancient Roman pottery
British expatriates in the United States